Man in Blues is a 2003 Hong Kong comedy-drama film directed by Yip Wai Ying and starring Wayne Lai and Nadia Chan. This film was rated Category III in Hong Kong.

Plot
Jackie Lai (Wayne Lai), a famous erotic movie star, decides to quit his career in order to take better care of his daughter Winsy (Jenny Shing). He hires his neighbor Pearl (Nadia Chan) to tutor Winsy. While then, he slowly wins Pearl's approval despite her aversion to his sordid past.

Cast
Wayne Lai as Jackie Lai
Nadia Chan as Pearl Ho
Jenny Shing as Winsy Lai
Jenny Yam as Judy Low
Bobby Yip as Kim Tai Chi
Donna Chu as Maggie
Lee Siu-kei as Director Chan
Charlie Cho as Boss Chow
Kau Man Lung as Brother Nine
Cheng Chu Fung as Mr. Wong
Eddie Chan as Brother Fung
Jameson Lam as Director Lam
Eileen Yeung
Wilson Ng

External links

Man in Blues at Hong Kong Cinemagic

Hong Kong comedy-drama films
2003 films
2003 comedy-drama films
2000s Cantonese-language films
Films set in Hong Kong
Films shot in Hong Kong
Films directed by Yip Wai Ying
2000s Hong Kong films